The Lockheed CP-140 Aurora is a maritime patrol aircraft operated by the Royal Canadian Air Force. The aircraft is based on the Lockheed P-3 Orion airframe, but mounts the electronics suite of the Lockheed S-3 Viking. "Aurora" refers to the Roman goddess of dawn who flies across the sky each morning ahead of the sun. Aurora also refers to the Aurora Borealis, the "northern lights", that are prominent over northern Canada and the Arctic Ocean.

The CP-140A Arcturus was a related variant used primarily for pilot training and coastal surface patrol missions.

Design and development
The CP-140 Aurora is very similar externally to the Lockheed P-3C Orion (Canadian ESM wingtip pods instead of the American ESM wing pod), but is different internally, using two sets of mission systems that were first installed in yet another Lockheed anti-submarine warfare aircraft, the carrier-based S-3A Viking. The aircraft's sensors are primarily intended for anti-submarine warfare (ASW) work but are also capable of maritime surveillance, counter-drug and search-and-rescue missions. The CP-140 is Canada's only strategic Intelligence Surveillance and Reconnaissance (ISR) aircraft, conducting long range missions over land, water and littoral areas. These missions are flown in support of Canadian Joint Operations Command, the RCMP, and several other federal government departments.

In 1991, Lockheed shut down its production lines in Burbank, California, for the P-3 Orion, which shares the same airframe with the CP-140. Three surplus airframes on hand were purchased by the Air Command, but delivered without the anti-submarine fit. These three aircraft were designated the CP-140A Arcturus and were used primarily for pilot training and coastal surface patrol missions.

Aurora Incremental Modernization Project

 
The Aurora Incremental Modernization Project (AIMP), initiated in 1998 to upgrade electronics of the Aurora fleet was halted by the government on 20 September 2007 to evaluate whether the aging fleet should continue to be upgraded or replaced by more modern aircraft. On 18 December 2007 the Department of National Defence rescinded this work suspension so that the project could continue. Work includes upgrading computer, navigation, communication and radar systems as well as making structural improvements to ten of eighteen aircraft. The intent of the modernization project is to "keep the aircraft safe and operationally viable until 2020.".

AIMP is currently divided into four "blocks". Block I is complete and concentrated on the replacement of unsupportable systems. Block II brought a glass cockpit with the Navigation and Flight Instruments (NFI) component provided by CMC Electronics, and a complete replacement of the communications suite. Block III is currently in progress, and is a wholesale replacement of the aircraft's sensors and mission computer. Block IV will consist of further upgrades to the tactical compartment and mission systems.

Once AIMP was completed the CP-140 was designated as CP-140M.

Aurora Structural Life Extension Program
The Aurora Structural Life Extension Project (ASLEP) is proceeding with 14 of the 18 Auroras scheduled to receive new wings and the replacement of key structural components. The complete ASLEP solution replaces the aircraft's outer wings, centre wing lower section and horizontal stabilizers with new production components. All fatigue-life limiting structures on the aircraft are replaced with enhanced-design components and improved corrosion-resistant materials that will greatly reduce maintenance costs over the aircraft's service life. This program is expected to extend the CP140s' service life by 15,000 flight hours per airframe.

Operational history

CP-140 Aurora

The Aurora was acquired in the early 1980s to replace the CP-107 Argus and to further support Canada's anti-submarine warfare mission obligations under NATO for the northwest Atlantic sector. Short deployments to Alaska (Adak), Hawaii (Kaneohe Bay), Iceland (Keflavik), the UK (St Mawgan and Kinloss), and Norway (Andoya) were the norm. However, since the end of the Cold War, they have been used primarily in coastal surveillance and sovereignty patrols by providing an all-weather mission surveillance platform. Increasingly, as the CP-140 moves into the 21st century, it is employed for domestic and international surveillance by CANCOM for security, counter-terrorism and smuggling, as well as to monitor foreign fishing fleets off Canada's coasts. CP-140s have also been deployed on operations such as Operation Assistance and Operation Apollo.

Deployments have included OP SHARPGUARD (Yugoslavia blockade), OP SIRIUS (Mediterranean Patrols), OP APOLLO (Persian Gulf region), and counter-narcotics patrols in the Gulf of Mexico and Pacific.  Through all this, patrols of the Canadian Arctic continue to take advantage of the airframe's unique abilities.

In 2011 and 2012, CP-140 aircraft performed maritime patrol missions in the Libyan waters to help in the enforcement of the no-fly zone over Libya under Operation Odyssey Dawn and Operation Unified Protector.

As of January 2017, two CP-140s were conducting overland surveillance missions against ISIL as part of Operation Impact. However one aircraft was withdrawn in May 2017.

From October 2018, due to support the implementation of United Nations Security Council sanctions imposed against North Korea, Canadian Armed Forces deploy periodically a Canadian frigate and/or a CP-140 Aurora on Operation Neon. In June 2022 it was reported that Chinese jets had repeatedly intercepted the Aurora in a manner which the Canada military said failed to adhere to international air safety norms. Some of these intercepts forced the Aurora to change its flight path to avoid collision with the intercepting aircraft. Canadian government officials said the incidents were happening with increasing frequency and that they had lodged protests on multiple occasions with their Chinese counterparts, although an article by Global News said that China is not believed to have responded to the reprimands as the interceptions had not stopped continuing.

In February 2023, as a result of recent violence and unrest, a CP-140 was deployed to Haiti to help "disrupt the activities of gangs" by providing surveillance and intelligence. Separately, a CP-140 collaborated with USAF F-22 Raptors to intercept and down an unidentified object over Yukon Territory.

CP-140A Arcturus

Lacking the expensive, heavy and sensitive anti-submarine warfare as well as the anti-surface warfare fittings of the CP-140 Aurora, the Arcturus was more fuel efficient and was used for crew training duties (such as touch-and-go landing practice), general maritime surface reconnaissance (detecting drug operations, smuggling of illegal immigrants, fisheries protection patrols, pollution monitoring, etc.), search-and-rescue assistance and Arctic sovereignty patrols.  The Arcturus did possess a superior AN/APS-507 surface search radar, incorporating modern functions such as track-while-scan that the Aurora's AN/APS-506 radar lacks but the Arcturus did not have an integrated mission computer, or mission systems. It did, however, maintain the same military communications suite as the CP-140 Aurora.

All three aircraft were based at 14 Wing. Upon retirement from flying operations, one was used for technician training with 404 Long Range Patrol and Training Squadron on base CFB Greenwood, Nova Scotia before being moved to the Greenwood Military Aviation Museum on base.  The last two of the CP-140As were retired in 2011 when they were delivered to the Aerospace Maintenance and Regeneration Group (AMARG) in Tucson, Arizona.

Replacement
Several options have been suggested for a CP-140M replacement. These include the Boeing P-8 Poseidon and the Raytheon Sentinel, based on the Bombardier Global Express.

Plans are to downsize the fleet from 18 to 14 aircraft, with three already being withdrawn and a fourth as a test aircraft to be retired in the near future. The retirement of the CP-140 is expected around 2030 may result in capability gap as the RCAF does not anticipate replacements to be delivered around  2032 to 2038. The RCAF's Weapon System Manager (WSM) is preparing and working with plans to have the CP-140M operational until 2035 to 2040.

Operators

 Royal Canadian Air Force
 404 Long Range Patrol and Training Squadron, CFB Greenwood, Nova Scotia
 4 × CP-140M Aurora
 405 Long Range Patrol Squadron, CFB Greenwood, Nova Scotia
 11 × CP-140M Aurora and 1 × CP-140 Aurora to be retained as a test aircraft until retirement in the near future.
 415 Long Range Patrol Force Development Squadron, CFB Greenwood, Nova Scotia
 407 Long Range Patrol Squadron, CFB Comox, British Columbia
 3 × CP-140M Aurora

Aircraft on display

 CP-140A #140119 on display at Greenwood Military Aviation Museum in Greenwood, Nova Scotia received the aircraft in 2016.

Specifications (CP-140)

See also

References
Notes

Bibliography

 Donald, David. The Encyclopedia of World Aircraft.  Etobicoke, Ontario: Prospero Books, 1997. .
 Pickler, Ron and Milberry, Larry. Canadair: The First 50 Years. Toronto: CANAV Books, 1995. .
 Winchester, Jim, ed. "Lockheed CP-140 Aurora." Modern Military Aircraft (Aviation Factfile). Rochester, Kent, UK: Grange Books plc, 2004. .

External links

 Canada's Air Force: CP-140 Aurora
 Canada's Air Force: CP-140A Arcturus

CP-140 Aurora
1970s United States patrol aircraft
Four-engined tractor aircraft
Low-wing aircraft
Four-engined turboprop aircraft
Signals intelligence
CP-140
Aircraft first flown in 1979

it:Lockheed P-3 Orion#Utilizzatori